The Shimano Front Freewheel (FFS) was a proprietary bicycle drivetrain design of the 1970s that placed a freewheel between the pedal cranks and the front chainrings — enabling the rider to shift gears while coasting. FFS rear freewheel is different than a standard freewheel because it's "stiff" with more friction than a normal rear freewheel. It will slip if necessary however, to stop the chain in the event of, for example, a clothing tangle — which could otherwise lead to injuries of the leg by the drivetrain, crashing of the bicycle, or both. 

FFS marketing followed Shimano's then-current path of beginning with lower-cost implementations of the system using low tech and usually heavier materials. The resulting system was substantially heavier than the standard freewheel and, in any event, did not penetrate the market noticeably, although Panasonic, Ross, Schwinn, and Raleigh briefly equipped bicycles with FFS. The late Sheldon Brown called FFS a "solution in search of a problem."

Non-proprietary front freewheels can currently be found on bikes used for bike trials riding, such as the Honda RN-01 G-cross. Such a system allows for the use of cheaper fixed-gear rear hubs instead of cassette hubs, lower gear ratios, and increased ground clearance at the bottom bracket.

References

Bicycle parts